National Museum of Science and Technology may refer to:

National Museum of Science and Technology (Bangladesh), in Dhaka, Bangladesh
National Museum of Science and Technology, Lahore, in Lahore, Pakistan
National Museum of Science and Technology (Spain), in La Coruña and Alcobendas, Spain
Ingenium, a Canadian crown corporation that operates several museums
 Canada Science and Technology Museum, formerly the National Museum of Science and Technology
Swedish National Museum of Science and Technology, in Stockholm, Sweden

See also
National Museum of Science (disambiguation)
National Science and Technology Museum, in Taiwan